Vitaly Komogorov (born 28 August 1991) is a Russian handball player who plays for HC Dobrogea Sud and the Russian national team.

He represented Russia at the 2019 World Men's Handball Championship.

Achievements
Liga Națională:  
Winner: 2018, 2019 
Supercupa României:  
Winner: 2018
LNH Division 1:  
Bronze Medalist: 2016
EHF Cup:  
Finalist: 2016

Individual awards  
 Prosport All-Star Left Back of the Romanian Liga Națională: 2018 
 Gala Premiilor Handbalului Românesc Liga Națională Left Back of the Season: 2019

References

1991 births
Living people
Russian male handball players
Russian expatriate sportspeople in France
Russian expatriate sportspeople in Romania
Russian expatriate sportspeople in Hungary
Expatriate handball players
Sportspeople from Volgograd
CS Dinamo București (men's handball) players